Niall mac Áeda may refer to:

Niall Caille (died 846), King of Ailech and High King of Ireland
Niall Glúndub (died 917), his grandson, also King of Ailech and High King of Ireland